Perttu Lindgren (born August 26, 1987) is a Finnish former professional ice hockey center who briefly played in the National Hockey League (NHL) with the Dallas Stars.

Playing career
Lindgren played with Ilves Tampere in the Finnish SM-liiga when he was drafted 75th overall in the 2005 NHL Entry Draft by the Dallas Stars. Lindgren signed an entry-level contract with the Stars and in the 2009–10 season, made his NHL debut, playing in a single game for the Stars.

On April 10, 2010, as a restricted free agent Lindgren opted to return to the SM-liiga, signing with Lukko Rauma. On May 19, 2012 Lindgren signed a contract with Kontinental Hockey League club Atlant Mytishchi. In his debut season in 2012–13 in November Atlant decided to put Lindgren on the waivers list, from which he was claimed by Amur Khabarovsk.

On March 18, 2013, Lindgren signed an initial one-year contract with Swiss club, HC Davos of the NLA, before during his first season in 2013–14, signing a three-year extension to remain in Davos on November 27, 2013.

On April 22, 2016, Lindgren was signed to a two-year contract extension by HC Davos.

On April 10, 2017, Lindgren agreed to an early two-year contract extension with HC Davos.

On January 6, 2021, HC Davos announced its intention to release Lindgren following bad performances with the team. Lindgren spent 8 seasons with HC Davos, appearing in 300 regular season games (247 points) and an additional 44 postseason contests (36 points). During his tenure in Davos, Lindgren won a NL title in 2015 and was crowned NL MVP for the 2015-16 season. He was also limited to 5 games during the 2017-18 season with a lingering hip injury. On January 11, 2021, Lindgren was eventually traded, along with Luca Hischier, to EHC Biel in exchange for David Ullström and Valentin Nüssbaumer.

Awards
 Won the Finnish Champion (Kanada-malja) in 2004–05.
 Won the Finnish SM-Liiga (Bronze) in 2010–11.
 Awarded the Veli-Pekka Ketola award in 2011.
 Won the  Swiss National League Champion in 2015-16.

International play
Lindgren played for Finland at the 2007 World Junior Ice Hockey Championships.

Career statistics

Regular season and playoffs

International

References

External links

1987 births
Living people
Amur Khabarovsk players
Atlant Moscow Oblast players
Dallas Stars draft picks
Dallas Stars players
HC Davos players
Finnish ice hockey centres
Ilves players
Iowa Stars players
Lukko players
Ice hockey people from Tampere
Texas Stars players